Punta Filetto Lighthouse is an active lighthouse located on the Isola Santa Maria, which makes part of the Maddalena archipelago, on the northern point of the island facing Barrettinelli di Fuori Lighthouse from which it is  away. The island is in the municipality of La Maddalena on the Tyrrhenian Sea.

Description
The keeper's house and the tower are painted in white, the lantern dome in grey metallic. The lighthouse is completely automated, powered by a solar unit and managed by the Marina Militare with the identification code number 1004 E.F.

In the 1956–57 school year, after many request from the inhabitants of the islands of Razzoli, Santa Maria and Spargi, a popular school was established for the children of the lighthouse keepers and the shepherds who lived there. The school was hosted inside the lighthouse and the lessons, held by the teacher Masia, started only on January 9, 1957, due to a lack of means.

In 1972 the lighthouse was abandoned by the keepers because it was automated, the building began to fall in ruin and the Arcipelago di La Maddalena National Park restored it in 2006; however the structure was covered with a scaffolding as shown in the image taken in 2009 and so it is still left.

See also
 List of lighthouses in Italy

References

External links

 Servizio Fari Marina Militare

Lighthouses in Italy
Buildings and structures in the Province of Sassari
Lighthouses completed in 1913
1913 establishments in Italy